Jessica Lynn Wright (née Garfola; born November 2, 1952) was the Under Secretary of Defense for Personnel and Readiness of the United States Department of Defense. She retired at the end of March 2015, succeeded by Brad Carson as Acting Under Secretary of Defense for Personnel and Readiness.  Laura Junor is the Principal Deputy Under Secretary of Defense for Personnel and Readiness.

Wright was previously the Adjutant General of Pennsylvania for the Pennsylvania Department of Military and Veterans Affairs.

In 2020, Jessica Wright was inducted into the U.S. Army Women's Foundation Hall of Fame.

References

Living people
Alderson Broaddus University alumni
American Senior Army Aviators
Webster University alumni
State cabinet secretaries of Pennsylvania
Obama administration personnel
United States Assistant Secretaries of Defense
1952 births